Everybody Down is the debut album by English poet and spoken word artist Kae Tempest, which was nominated for the 2014 Mercury Prize. Its tracks comprise a unified story cycle with a coherent narrative arc, based upon a main character named Becky.

Critical reception
According to review aggregator Metacritic, Everybody Down has a score of 77 out of 100, indicating "generally favorable reviews."

Luke Beardsworth of Drowned in Sound gave the album a 7 out of 10, writing, "Everybody Down is powerful and gritty and it tackles subjects such as sex work and drug deals with wit and subtlety beyond measure."

Track listing

Charts

References

External links
 

2014 debut albums
Kae Tempest albums
Big Dada albums
Albums produced by Dan Carey (record producer)
2010s spoken word albums
Spoken word albums by English artists